Kalateh-ye Bagh may refer to:
 Bagh, South Khorasan
 Tuti, South Khorasan